There are a number of schools referred to as Norwood School:

United Kingdom
The Norwood School (formerly Norwood School for Girls, colloquially Norwood Girls' School)

United States
Norwood School (Norwood, Arkansas), listed on the National Register of Historic Places (NRHP) in Benton County, Arkansas
Norwood School (Bethesda, Maryland)
Norwood Public School District (Norwood, New Jersey)